This is a list of unified school districts (USD) in the state of Kansas.  It is grouped by county, based on the headquarters location of each school district.

Allen County

 Humboldt USD 258 
 Iola USD 257 
 Marmaton Valley USD 256

Anderson County

 Crest USD 479 
 Garnett USD 365

Atchison County

 Atchison County USD 377 
 Atchison USD 409

Barber County

 Barber County North USD 254 
 South Barber USD 255

Barton County

 Ellinwood USD 355 
 Great Bend USD 428 
 Hoisington USD 431

Bourbon County

 Fort Scott USD 234 
 Uniontown USD 235

Brown County

 Hiawatha USD 415 
 South Brown County USD 430

Butler County

 Andover USD 385 
 Augusta USD 402
 Bluestem USD 205 
 Circle USD 375 
 Douglass USD 396
 El Dorado USD 490 
 Flinthills USD 492 
 Remington USD 206 
 Rose Hill USD 394

Chase County
 Chase County USD 284

Chautauqua County

 Cedar Vale USD 285 
 Chautauqua County USD 286

Cherokee County

 Baxter Springs USD 508 
 Columbus USD 493
 Galena USD 499 
 Riverton USD 404

Cheyenne County

 Cheylin USD 103 
 Saint Francis USD 297

Clark County

 Ashland USD 220 
 Minneola USD 219

Clay County
 Clay County USD 379

Cloud County

 Concordia USD 333 
 Southern Cloud USD 334

Coffey County

 Burlington USD 244
 Lebo–Waverly USD 243 
 LeRoy–Gridley USD 245

Comanche County
 Comanche County USD 300

Cowley County

 Arkansas City USD 470 
 Central USD 462 
 Dexter USD 471 
 Udall USD 463 
 Winfield USD 465

Crawford County

 Frontenac USD 249 
 Girard USD 248 
 Northeast USD 246 
 Pittsburg USD 250
 Southeast USD 247

Decatur County
 Oberlin USD 294

Dickinson County

 Abilene USD 435 
 Chapman USD 473 
 Herington USD 487 
 Rural Vista USD 481
 Solomon USD 393

Doniphan County

 Doniphan West USD 111 
 Riverside USD 114  
 Troy USD 429

Douglas County

 Baldwin City USD 348 
 Eudora USD 491 
 Lawrence USD 497

Edwards County

 Kinsley–Offerle USD 347 
 Lewis USD 502 (K-6)

Elk County

 Elk Valley USD 283 
 West Elk USD 282

Ellis County

 Ellis USD 388 
 Hays USD 489 
 Victoria USD 432

Ellsworth County

 Central Plains USD 112 
 Ellsworth USD 327

Finney County

 Garden City USD 457 
 Holcomb USD 363

Ford County

 Bucklin USD 459 
 Dodge City USD 443 
 Spearville USD 381

Franklin County

 Central Heights USD 288 
 Ottawa USD 290 
 Wellsville USD 289 
 West Franklin USD 287

Geary County
 Geary County USD 475

Gove County

 Grinnell USD 291 (5-8)
 Quinter USD 293 
 Wheatland USD 292 (9-12)

Graham County
 Graham County USD 281

Grant County
 Ulysses USD 214

Gray County

 Cimarron–Ensign USD 102 
 Copeland USD 476
 Ingalls USD 477 
 Montezuma USD 371

Greeley County
 Greeley County USD 200

Greenwood County

 Eureka USD 389
 Hamilton USD 390 
 Madison–Virgil USD 386

Hamilton County
 Syracuse USD 494

Harper County

 Attica USD 511 
 Chaparral USD 361

Harvey County

 Burrton USD 369
 Halstead–Bentley USD 440 
 Hesston USD 460 
 Newton USD 373 
 Sedgwick USD 439

Haskell County

 Satanta USD 507 
 Sublette USD 374

Hodgeman County
 Jetmore USD 227

Jackson County

 Holton USD 336 
 North Jackson USD 335 
 Royal Valley USD 337

Jefferson County

 Jefferson County North USD 339 
 Jefferson West USD 340 
 McLouth USD 342 
 Oskaloosa USD 341 
 Perry USD 343 
 Valley Falls USD 338

Jewell County
 Rock Hills USD 107

Johnson County

 Blue Valley USD 229 (Johnson County)
 De Soto USD 232 
 Gardner–Edgerton USD 231 
 Olathe USD 233 
 Shawnee Mission USD 512 
 Spring Hill USD 230

Kearny County

 Deerfield USD 216 
 Lakin USD 215

Kingman County

 Cunningham–West Kingman County USD 332
 Kingman–Norwich USD 331

Kiowa County

 Haviland USD 474 (K-8)
 Kiowa County USD 422

Labette County

 Chetopa–St. Paul USD 505 
 Labette County USD 506 
 Oswego USD 504 
 Parsons USD 503

Lane County

 Dighton USD 482 
 Healy USD 468

Leavenworth County

 Basehor–Linwood USD 458 
 Easton USD 449 
 Fort Leavenworth USD 207  
 Lansing USD 469 
 Leavenworth USD 453 
 Tonganoxie USD 464

Lincoln County

 Lincoln USD 298 
 Sylvan–Lucas USD 299

Linn County

 Jayhawk USD 346 
 Pleasanton USD 344 
 Prairie View USD 362

Logan County

 Oakley USD 274 
 Triplains USD 275

Lyon County

 Emporia USD 253 
 North Lyon County USD 251 
 Southern Lyon County USD 252

Marion County

 Centre USD 397 
 Goessel USD 411 
 Hillsboro USD 410  
 Marion–Florence USD 408 
 Peabody–Burns USD 398

Marshall County

 Marysville USD 364 
 Valley Heights USD 498 
 Vermillion USD 380

McPherson County

 Canton–Galva USD 419 
 Inman USD 448 
 McPherson USD 418 
 Moundridge USD 423 
 Smoky Valley USD 400

Meade County

 Fowler USD 225 
 Meade USD 226

Miami County

 Louisburg USD 416  
 Osawatomie USD 367 
 Paola USD 368

Mitchell County

 Beloit USD 273
 Waconda USD 272

Montgomery County

 Caney Valley USD 436 
 Cherryvale USD 447 
 Coffeyville USD 445 
 Independence USD 446

Morris County
 Morris County USD 417

Morton County

 Elkhart USD 218 
 Rolla USD 217

Nemaha County

 Nemaha Central USD 115 
 Prairie Hills USD 113

Neosho County

 Chanute USD 413 
 Erie–Galesburg USD 101

Ness County

 Ness City USD 303 
 Western Plains USD 106

Norton County

 Northern Valley USD 212 
 Norton USD 211

Osage County

 Burlingame USD 454 
 Lyndon USD 421 
 Marais des Cygnes Valley USD 456 
 Osage City USD 420 
 Santa Fe Trail USD 434

Osborne County

 Osborne USD 392

Ottawa County

 North Ottawa County USD 239 
 Twin Valley USD 240

Pawnee County

 Fort Larned USD 495 
 Pawnee Heights USD 496

Phillips County

 Logan USD 326 
 Phillipsburg USD 325 
 Thunder Ridge USD 110

Pottawatomie County

 Kaw Valley USD 321 
 Onaga USD 322 
 Rock Creek USD 323
 Wamego USD 320

Pratt County

 Pratt USD 382 
 Skyline USD 438

Rawlins County
 Rawlins County USD 105

Reno County

 Buhler USD 313 
 Fairfield USD 310 
 Haven USD 312 
 Hutchinson USD 308
 Nickerson–South Hutchinson USD 309 
 Pretty Prairie USD 311

Republic County

 Pike Valley USD 426 
 Republic County USD 109

Rice County

 Chase–Raymond USD 401 
 Little River–Windom USD 444 
 Lyons USD 405
 Sterling USD 376

Riley County

 Blue Valley USD 384 (Riley County)
 Manhattan–Ogden USD 383 
 Riley County USD 378

Rooks County

 Palco USD 269 
 Plainville USD 270
 Stockton USD 271

Rush County

 La Crosse USD 395
 Otis–Bison USD 403

Russell County

 Paradise USD 399 
 Russell County USD 407

Saline County

 Ell–Saline USD 307 
 Salina USD 305 
 Southeast of Saline USD 306

Scott County
 Scott County USD 466

Sedgwick County

 Cheney USD 268 
 Clearwater USD 264 
 Derby USD 260 
 Goddard USD 265 
 Haysville USD 261 
 Maize USD 266 
 Mulvane USD 263
 Renwick USD 267 
 Valley Center USD 262 
 Wichita USD 259

Seward County

 Kismet–Plains USD 483
 Liberal USD 480

Shawnee County

 Auburn–Washburn USD 437 
 Seaman USD 345 
 Shawnee Heights USD 450 
 Silver Lake USD 372 
 Topeka USD 501

Sheridan County
 Hoxie USD 412

Sherman County
 Goodland USD 352

Smith County

 Smith Center USD 237

Stafford County

 Macksville USD 351 
 St. John–Hudson USD 350 
 Stafford USD 349

Stanton County
 Stanton County USD 452

Stevens County

 Hugoton USD 210 
 Moscow USD 209

Sumner County

 Argonia USD 359 
 Belle Plaine USD 357 
 Caldwell USD 360 
 Conway Springs USD 356 
 Oxford USD 358
 South Haven USD 509 
 Wellington USD 353

Thomas County

 Brewster USD 314 
 Colby USD 315 
 Golden Plains USD 316

Trego County
 WaKeeney USD 208

Wabaunsee County

 Mission Valley USD 330 
 Wabaunsee USD 329

Wallace County

 Wallace USD 241 
 Weskan USD 242

Washington County

 Barnes–Hanover–Linn USD 223
 Clifton–Clyde USD 224 
 Washington County USD 108

Wichita County
 Leoti–Wichita County USD 467

Wilson County

 Altoona–Midway USD 387 
 Fredonia USD 484 
 Neodesha USD 461

Woodson County
 Woodson USD 366

Wyandotte County

 Bonner Springs–Edwardsville USD 204 
 Kansas City USD 500
 Piper USD 203 
 Turner USD 202

District name changes
 Cherokee USD 247 - changed name in 2007 to Southeast USD 247.
 Greensburg USD 422 - changed name in 2010s to Kiowa County USD 422.
 Mill Creek Valley USD 329 - changed name in 2016 to Wabaunsee USD 329.
 Wabaunsee East USD 330 - changed name in 2004 to Mission Valley USD 330.

District consolidated or dissolved
The number of school districts in Kansas has been decreasing as rural flight causing smaller rural communities.
 Atwood USD 318 - consolidated with Herndon USD 317 in 2003 to form Rawlins County USD 105.
 Axtell USD 488 - consolidated with Sabetha Wetmore USD 441 on July 1, 2010 to form Prairie Hills USD 113.
 B & B USD 451 - consolidated with Nemaha Valley USD 442 on July 31, 2011 to form Nemaha Central USD 115.
 Bazine USD 304 - consolidated with Ransom USD 302 in 2004 to form Western Plains USD 106.
 Belleville USD 427 - consolidated with Hillcrest USD 455 in 2006 to form Republic County USD 109.
 Claflin USD 354 - consolidated with Lorraine USD 328 on July 1, 2010 to form Central Plains USD 112.
 Eastern Heights USD 324 - consolidated with West Smith County USD 238 on July 1, 2008 to form Thunder Ridge USD 110.
 Elwood USD 486 - consolidated with Wathena USD 406 on July 1, 2010 to form Riverside USD 114.
 Hanston USD 228 - dissolved in 2011 to merge with Jetmore USD 227.
 Herndon USD 317 - consolidated with Atwood USD 318 in 2003 to form Rawlins County USD 105.
 Highland USD 425 - consolidated with Midway–Denton USD 433 in 2009 to form Doniphan West USD 111.
 Hillcrest USD 455 - consolidated with Belleville USD 427 in 2006 to form Republic County USD 109.
 Jewell USD 279 - dissolved on July 1, 2009 to split between Beloit USD 273 and Rock Hills USD 107.
 Lorraine USD 328 - consolidated with Claflin USD 328 on July 1, 2010 to form Central Plains USD 112.
 Mankato USD 278 - consolidated with White Rock USD 104 in 2006 to form Rock Hills USD 107.
 Midway–Denton USD 433 - consolidated with Highland USD 425 in 2009 to form Doniphan West USD 111.
 Morland USD 280 - dissolved in 2002 to merge with Hill City USD 281.
 Mullinville USD 424 - dissolved in 2011 to merge with Kiowa County USD 422.
 Nemaha Valley USD 442 - consolidated with B & B USD 451 on July 31, 2011 to form Nemaha Central USD 115.
 Nes Tre La Go USD 301 - dissolved in 2006 to split between Western Plains USD 106 and Ness County USD 303.
 North Central USD 221 - consolidated with Washington USD 222 in 2006 to form Washington County USD 108.
 Prairie Heights USD 295 - dissolved on July 1, 2006 to split between Hoxie USD 412 and Oberlin USD 294.
 Ransom USD 302 - consolidated with Bazine USD 304 in 2004 to form Western Plains USD 106.
 Sabetha Wetmore USD 441 - consolidated with Axtell USD 488 on July 1, 2010 to form Prairie Hills USD 113.
 Washington USD 222 - consolidated with North Central USD 221 in 2006 to form Washington County USD 108.
 Wathena USD 406 - consolidated with Elwood USD 486 on July 1, 2010 to form Riverside USD 114.
 West Smith County USD 238 - consolidated with Eastern Heights USD 324 on July 1, 2008 to form Thunder Ridge USD 110.
 West Solomon USD 213 - dissolved on July 1, 2010 to merge with Norton USD 211.
 White Rock USD 104 - consolidated with Mankato USD 278 in 2006 to form Rock Hills USD 107.

See also

 Kansas State Department of Education
 Kansas State High School Activities Association
 List of high schools in Kansas
 Education in Kansas

References

External links
State
 Kansas State Department Of Education, KSDE
 Kansas State High School Activities Association, KSHSAA

KSDE Documents
 School Districts by County, KSDE
 Schools in Alphabetical Order, KSDE

KSDE Maps
 Kansas School District Boundary Map: 2004, 2011, 2012, 2018, 2019, 2020, KSDE
 School District Maps, KDOT

District consolidations
 School consolidations in Kansas for past decade; Topeka-Capital Journal; July 24, 2011.

School districts
Kansas
School districts